The 1992 Asian Acrobatic Gymnastics Championships were the first edition of the Asian Acrobatic Gymnastics Championships, and were held in Hong Kong, from December 11 to 13, 1992.

Participant nations

Medal summary

References

A
Asian Gymnastics Championships
International gymnastics competitions hosted by Hong Kong